The 2012 USASA Region I National Cup will be a qualifying tournament to determine which clubs from the first region of the United States Adult Soccer Association will qualify for the first round proper of the 2012 U.S. Open Cup. The defending co-champions, New York Pancyprian-Freedoms and Phoenix SC both failed to qualify for the tournament, losing in their respective state/subregional tournaments.

Three teams from Region I will qualify for the U.S. Open Cup in April, with the finals held June 17 in Horsham, Pennsylvania. The winner will then qualify for the National Finals which will be July 20–22 in Chicago, Illinois.

Qualification

Bracket

Results 
The semifinal winners, NY Greek American Atlas and Dulles Sportsplex Aegean Hawks, both qualified for the U.S. Open Cup and will meet in the finals in June. The winner of the third place game will also qualify for the Cup.

 1st round
Battery Park Gunners (Mass.) 0–2 NY Greek American Atlas (East NY)
 West Chester United Predators (East PA) 1–3 Dulles Sportsplex Aegean Hawks (DC/VA)
 Semifinals
 NY Greek American Atlas 2–0 Jersey Shore Boca
 Maryland Bays 0–2 Dulles Sportsplex Aegean Hawks
 Third place
Maryland Bays vs. Jersey Shore Boca (Time/Location TBA)

Advancing to Open Cup
  Greek American AA
  Aegean Hawks
  Jersey Shore Boca

See also 
 2012 U.S. Open Cup
 2012 U.S. Open Cup qualification
 United States Adult Soccer Association

References 

 
USASA Region I National Cup
2012